James Robert Browning (October 1, 1918 – May 6, 2012) was an American attorney and jurist who served as a United States circuit judge of the United States Court of Appeals for the Ninth Circuit.

Early life and education

Born on October 1, 1918, in Great Falls, Montana, Browning received a Bachelor of Laws in 1941 from the Alexander Blewett III School of Law at the University of Montana.

Career 

He was a special attorney for the Antitrust Division of the United States Department of Justice in Denver, Colorado from 1941 to 1943. He was a United States Army lieutenant from 1943 to 1946. He was again a special attorney with the Antitrust Division in Washington, D.C. from 1946 to 1948. He was Chief of the Northwest Regional Office of the Antitrust Division in Seattle, Washington from 1948 to 1949. He was Assistant Chief of the General Litigation Section of the Antitrust Division in Washington, D.C. from 1949 to 1951. He was First Assistant of the Civil Division of the United States Department of Justice in Washington, D.C. from 1951 to 1952. He was Executive Assistant for the Office of the Attorney General of the United States from 1952 to 1953. He was the Chief of the Executive Office for United States Attorneys in 1953. He was in private practice in Washington, D.C. from 1953 to 1958. He was Clerk of the Supreme Court of the United States from 1958 to 1961.

Federal judicial service

Browning was nominated by President John F. Kennedy on September 6, 1961, to a seat on the United States Court of Appeals for the Ninth Circuit vacated by Judge Walter Lyndon Pope. He was confirmed by the United States Senate on September 14, 1961, and received his commission on September 18, 1961. He served as Chief Judge and a member of the Judicial Conference of the United States from 1976 to 1988. He assumed senior status on September 1, 2000. He was the last federal appeals court judge in active service to have been appointed by President Kennedy. His service terminated on May 6, 2012, due to his death in Marin County, California.

Honors

In 1992, Browning was awarded the Edward J. Devitt Award for Distinguished Service to Justice, which is presented annually to a federal judge. In 2001, the Montana State Bar Association gave Browning its highest honor, the Jameson Award. In 2005, the main Ninth Circuit Court of Appeals courthouse in San Francisco was named in his honor.

See also
 List of United States federal judges by longevity of service

References

External links
 
 "Exhibit Highlights Career of Late Chief Judge"

1918 births
2012 deaths
Clerks of the Supreme Court of the United States
Georgetown University faculty
Judges of the United States Court of Appeals for the Ninth Circuit
Montana State University alumni
New York University School of Law faculty
People from Great Falls, Montana
Military personnel from Montana
United States Army officers
United States court of appeals judges appointed by John F. Kennedy
20th-century American judges
University of Montana alumni
Lawyers from Washington, D.C.
United States Army personnel of World War II